Bobbie Wygant (born Roberta Connolly; November 22, 1926) is an American television news reporter, film critic, talk show host, and interviewer who has worked for NBC 5 for over 70 years. She is known for her filmed interviews with celebrities.

Early years
The granddaughter of Mr. and Mrs. Robert E. Connolly, Wygant was born in Lafayette, Indiana. 
She described her ancestry as French, Irish, and Texan. She has two younger brothers, Gordon and Carl Connolly. Their mother died of cancer when Wygant was 16 years old. She remained a full-time student while caring for her mother during her extended illness, after which she maintained the home for her father and her brothers. Her mother's death discouraged her from pursuing a career as a doctor, which she had originally intended.

A trip to the 1939 New York World's Fair sparked her interest in television as she visited an experimental TV studio and appeared in front of a camera. Wygant graduated from St. Francis High School and from Purdue University in 1947, majoring in media broadcasting as well as psychology. At Purdue she was a member of Alpha Epsilon Rho, Alpha Xi Delta sorority, Gold Peppers, Purdue Playshop, and the WBAA staff.

Career
Wygant started her journalist career working for the Texas station KXAS-TV in 1948, then known as WBAP-TV. Her hiring occurred two weeks before the station began broadcasting. She began as a writer, creating copy for "commercials, intros to shows, whatever needed to be written."
 

Later she worked in front of cameras, helping hosts of programs. She gained her own talk program, Dateline, in 1960 after she filled in for a week when the original host was sick with the flu. She interviewed a variety of guests on it. That made her the first woman in the southwestern United States to host a general-interest talk program. Around 1975, after a change in station ownership, she began working in the news department, particularly teaming with Chip Moody on Inside Area 5, which featured interviews and coverage of community activities. Beginning in 1977, she was co-host of the local component of The Jerry Lewis MDA Labor Day Telethon. Wygant is a founding member of the National Broadcast Film Critics Association.

Celebrity interviews
Over the course of her career in television, Wygant has interviewed hundreds of celebrities. These include The Beatles, Madonna, Bob Hope, and Bette Davis. The interviews mainly focus on the celebrity's latest work, such as an actor's most recent film. In preparation for an interview, she says that she does the necessary research independently. Her interviewing style has been praised by the likes of Stanley Kramer and Dustin Hoffman.

Personal life
In June 1947, she married Philip Warren Wygant at age 20. They had met at Purdue when she worked at the radio station at which he was program supervisor. He died in April 1986 at the age of 60 due to liver disease. In addition to their professional activities, they operated a tree farm in east Texas. The couple did not have any children.

In early 2019, she published her autobiography, Talking to the Stars: Bobbie Wygant's Seventy Years in Television.

Awards
Local and regional awards for Wygant include the Texas Arts Alliance's award for outstanding coverage of the arts in 1978 and her being named the Zonta Club of Fort Worth's executive woman of the year in 1980. 

Nationally, in 2000, the National Broadcast Film Critics Association presented Wygant with the Critic's Critic Award. She received the Emmy Gold Circle in 2004, honoring people with longevity in the television industry. In 2014, she won the Gracie Award for Outstanding Reporter/Correspondent from the Alliance for Women In Media. She started working only part-time in 2002, having worked full-time for over 50 years up until then. She is a recipient of Alpha Xi Delta's Woman of Distinction Award.

References

External links

The Bobbie Wygant Archive contains clips of some of Wygant's interviews with celebrities

1926 births
Living people
American television reporters and correspondents
American television hosts
Purdue University alumni
American television talk show hosts
American people of French descent
American people of Irish descent